Ksawery is a Polish given name version of name Xavier, other variation is Xawery, may refer to:

People
 Ksawery Błasiak (1900–1966), lieutenant of the Polish Army
 Ksawery Jasieński (born 1931), Polish radio speaker, voice actor
 Ksawery Liske (1838–1891), Polish historian, a founder of the Lwów's historical school
 Ksawery Lubomirski (1747–1819), Polish noble, general
 Ksawery Pruszyński (1907–1950), journalist, publicist, writer and diplomat
 Ksawery Tartakower (1887–1956), Polish and French chess player
 Ksawery Szlenkier (born 1981), Polish actor
 Ksawery Wyrożemski (1915–1967), Polish fighter pilot 
 Ksawery Zakrzewski (1876–1915), Polish physician

 Adam Franciszek Ksawery Rostkowski (1660–1738), Polish Roman Catholic bishop 
 Franciszek Ksawery Branicki (1730–1819), Polish nobleman, magnate, French count
 Franciszek Ksawery Chomiński (1730–1809), Polish soldier, politician, translator and poet
 Franciszek Ksawery Dmochowski (1762–1818), Polish Romantic novelist, poet
 Franciszek Ksawery Drucki-Lubecki (1778–1846), Polish politician, freemason and diplomat
 Franciszek Ksawery Godebski (1801–1869), Polish writer and journalist
 Franciszek Ksawery Lampi (1782–1852), Polish Romantic painter
 Franciszek Ksawery Latinik (1864–1949), Polish military officer
 Franciszek Ksawery Matejko (1793–1860), musician, father of Polish painter Jan Matejko
 Franciszek Ksawery Niesiołowski (1771–1845), Polish general in the Kościuszko Uprising
 Franciszek Ksawery Wierzchleyski (1803–1884), Polish Roman Catholic archbishop 
 Franciszek Ksawery Zachariasiewicz (1770–1845), Polish Roman Catholic bishop
 Jan Ksawery Kaniewski (1805–1867), Polish painter 
 Józef Ksawery Elsner (1769–1854), Polish composer
 Paweł Ksawery Brzostowski (1739-1827), Polish noble, writer, publicist
 Włodzimierz Ksawery Dzieduszycki (1825–1899), Polish noble, political activist

Places
 Ksawery, Kuyavian-Pomeranian Voivodeship, Poland

masculine given names
Polish masculine given names